Moure may refer to:

Places 
 Moure (Felgueiras), a parish in Felgueiras, Portugal
 Moure (Póvoa de Lanhoso), a parish in Póvoa de Lanhoso, Portugal
 Moure (Vila Verde), a parish in Vila Verde, Portugal
 Moure (Barcelos), a Portuguese parish

People 
 Erín Moure, Canadian poet of Galician descent
 Padre Jesus Santiago Moure, a Brazilian scientist who won the National Order of Scientific Merit for Biology
 Santiago Moure, a Colombian comedy actor
 Teresa Moure, a Galician writer
 Consuelo Moure, a Colombian actress from Pamplona
 Gloria Moure, a Spanish art historian, critic, curator and editor
 José María Cordovez Moure, a Colombian writer and historian

See also
 LaMoure (disambiguation)